WTIC (1080 kHz "WTIC NewsTalk 1080") is a commercial AM radio station in Hartford, Connecticut.  It airs a news/talk radio format and is owned by Audacy, Inc.  The station's studios and offices are on Executive Drive in Farmington.  The transmitter is off Deercliff Road in Avon, Connecticut.  WTIC is the primary entry point (PEP) for the Emergency Alert System (EAS) in Connecticut.

WTIC is a Class A, clear channel station powered at 50,000 watts, the maximum permitted for U.S. AM stations.  It has a non-directional signal in the daytime.  To protect the other Class A station on AM 1080, sister station KRLD in Dallas, WTIC uses a directional antenna at night, when radio waves travel farther. The signal can be picked up throughout Southern New England and parts of Vermont, New Hampshire and New York by day.  With a good radio, WTIC can be heard over much of the Eastern United States and Eastern Canada at night.

Programming
On weekdays, WTIC features local shows during the day, with syndicated programs at night, including Dana Loesch, Sean Hannity and Coast to Coast AM with George Noory.  On weekends, specialty shows are heard on money, health, real estate, travel, pets and the law, some of which are paid brokered programming. 

The station is an affiliate of the Boston Red Sox and New England Patriots Radio Networks. The station features local newsbreaks, as well as updates from CBS Radio News. WTIC's newsroom is staffed 24 hours a day with a team of local newscasters and reporters.  It shares some news and weather forecasts with WFSB, the CBS TV affiliate in Hartford.

History

Early years

WTIC is the second oldest radio station in Connecticut, after WDRC, which went on the air in 1922.  WTIC was first authorized on December 17, 1924.  It began a series of test transmissions later that month. The station began regular programming with a debut broadcast on February 10, 1925. The station was owned by the Travelers Insurance Company and its call sign reflects the initials of that corporation.

The station was among the first affiliates of the NBC Red Network, carrying its schedule of dramas, comedies, news, sports, soap operas, game shows and big band broadcasts during the "Golden Age of Radio". By the 1930s, WTIC was powered at 50,000 watts, originally at 1060 kilocycles.  In 1941, when the North American Regional Broadcasting Agreement (NARBA) went into effect, WTIC moved to its current dial position at 1080 kHz.

WTIC is known for its historic time tone, which is a broadcast of the Morse code letter "V" every hour on the hour, which has been in place since 1943. This makes it one of the oldest continuously broadcasting radio time tones in the world. WTIC employs a GPS master clock system that fires the custom-built time-tone generator shortly before the top of the hour, timed such that the final tone of the sequence occurs precisely on the hour (even though everything else heard on the station is on a 10-second delay), and listeners have been setting their watches to WTIC for many years. The notes of the sequence were pitched to mimic the famous opening sequence of Ludwig van Beethoven's Fifth Symphony, whose "short-short-short-long" rhythm matches that of the Morse code letter "V". The Morse code letter "V" for Victory was selected during the height of World War II.

Bob Steele

WTIC's original studios were in the Travelers Insurance Building at 26 Grove Street in Hartford.  Grove Street was later renamed Bob Steele Street in honor of longtime WTIC personality Bob Steele, who spent 66 years on WTIC, most of them as the morning drive time host.  He joined the station in 1936.  At one point, nearly a third of all radios in the Hartford area were tuned to Steele's wake up show.  Even after retiring from weekday mornings in 1991, he continued hosting Saturday mornings until his death in 2002 at age 91.

In 1940, WTIC began experimenting with FM radio, putting W1XSO on 43.2 MHz on the air. It later became 96.5 WTIC-FM, mostly simulcasting the AM station in its early years. In 1957, a television station was added, WTIC-TV on channel 3 (now WFSB). As network programming moved from radio to television in the 1950s, WTIC-AM-FM switched to a full service, middle of the road format of popular music, talk, news and sports.  In the 1960s, WTIC-FM started playing blocks of classical music in the afternoon and evening, eventually ending its simulcast of 1080 WTIC. By the early 1970s, WTIC became more of an adult contemporary full service format, with talk shows in the evening.

Changes in ownership
In 1973, Travelers Insurance announced it would divest its broadcasting properties.  Channel 3 was sold to Post-Newsweek Stations (now the Graham Media Group) in 1974, switching its call sign to WFSB.  WTIC-AM-FM were sold to a group of its managers, doing business as the "Ten-Eighty Corporation".  Also in the 1980s, some more talk shows were added to WTIC's line up.  In the 1990s, as fewer listeners tuned to AM radio for music, WTIC added more talk programming, eventually eliminating the music shows.

In 1991, Bob Steele decided to retire from hosting weekday mornings.  Tom McCarthy had already begun doing the early part of the morning shift and took over the entire 5:30 to 10 a.m. time slot. In 1998, CBS Radio acquired WTIC-AM-FM. The acquisition ended WTIC's 70-year affiliation with NBC Radio; since then it has aired CBS Radio News updates. Its former television sister had been Connecticut's CBS affiliate since 1958.

Schedule shake-up
In December 2008, the station made several programming changes.  Former WTNH-TV anchor Diane Smith was dropped from the morning show she hosted with Ray Dunaway.  Smith later joined the University of New Haven journalism department.  "Sound Off Connecticut" hosted by conservative Jim Vicevich had an hour added to his show. The station continued to carry Rush Limbaugh at noon, but the afternoon drive personality, vocal liberal Colin McEnroe, was dismissed and his time slot replaced with a three-hour local and national news roundup.

On February 2, 2017, CBS Radio announced it would merge with Entercom. The merger was approved on November 9, 2017, and was consummated on the February 17.

References

External links

 
 
FCC History Cards for WTIC
 Northeast Airchecks, with an aircheck of their switch to 50,000 watts in 1929
 Goldenage-WTIC.org In the late 1960s, with declining listenership at night, WTIC management decided that there was a market for long-form shows that could be packaged and sold to sponsors. Two of those shows were The Golden Age of Radio and A One Night Stand with the Big Bands. They were broadcast monthly through the mid 1970s, and can be heard here, thanks to a project created by former WTIC personality, Dick Bertel, and former WTIC engineer, Bob Scherago.
 WTIC Alumni website A site that was created by Bill Clede and carried on by David Kaplan featuring pictures, audio, information and trivia about the old WTIC AM/FM/TV before its sale by the Travelers in 1974.

TIC
News and talk radio stations in the United States
Radio stations established in 1924
The Travelers Companies
1924 establishments in Connecticut
Audacy, Inc. radio stations
Clear-channel radio stations